John Michael Wallace (born October 28, 1940), is a professor of Atmospheric Sciences at the University of Washington, as well as the former director of the Joint Institute for the Study of the Atmosphere and Ocean (JISAO)—a joint research venture between the University of Washington and the National Oceanic and Atmospheric Administration (NOAA).

His research concerns understanding global climate and its variations using observations and covers the quasi biennial oscillation, Pacific decadal oscillation and the annular modes of the Arctic oscillation and the Antarctic oscillation, and the dominant spatial patterns in month-to-month and year-to-year climate variability, including the one through which El Niño phenomenon in the tropical Pacific influences climate over North America.  He is also the coauthor with Peter V. Hobbs of what is generally considered the standard introductory textbook in the field: Atmospheric Science: An Introductory Survey. He was the third most cited geoscientist during the period 1973–2007.

Awards
1993 Carl-Gustaf Rossby Research Medal of the American Meteorological Society
1999 Roger Revelle Medal of the American Geophysical Union
2016 Symons Gold Medal of the Royal Meteorological Society

References

External links 
 Home page
 Essay on global warming from 1999
 Arctic Oscillation
 Joint Institute for the Study of the Atmosphere and Ocean (JISAO)
  Atmospheric Science:  An Introductory Survey, Second Edition by John Wallace and Peter Hobbs

American climatologists
Members of the United States National Academy of Sciences
Foreign Members of the Russian Academy of Sciences
Living people
University of Washington faculty
1940 births